Auber is a station on RER A in Paris. Opened on 23 November 1971 and inaugurated during a ceremony by singers Dalida and Adamo, it is one of the largest vaulted underground stations in the world.

The station comprises a main train hall with a superposed ticket hall, together with an extensive network of tunnels connecting to the neighbouring Métro stations Opéra, Havre–Caumartin and Saint-Lazare, as well as Haussmann–Saint-Lazare on RER E. It takes its name from Rue Auber, under which it is situated. This street is in turn named after the mostly forgotten 19th-century composer Daniel Auber. A complete renovation of the station was started in 2017 and is due to be finished in 2022.

Engineering
Auber is built in the style of the traditional vaulted Métro station as pioneered by Fulgence Bienvenüe, with central tracks and lateral platforms. The difference in engineering terms is that Auber (along with Charles de Gaulle–Étoile and Nation stations) was constructed at depth, entirely underground, on a far larger scale than any Métro station.

To build the 225-metre long, 24-metre wide train hall and its even larger piggy-backing ticket hall, it was necessary to excavate a cavity 40-metre wide, 20-metre high and 250-metre long—this 30-metre underneath the busy city centre in unstable waterlogged sedimentary rock. The resulting station is cathedral-like in proportions, with a ticket hall so spacious that there is room for a mezzanine. The entire construction is waterproofed on both sides by a 7-metre thick, 10-metre high abutment of concrete which contains escalators linking the two levels.

The station's eccentrically audacious scale and damp setting earned it references as "the world's largest submarine". With the other two deep single-vaulted stations on RER A it was retrospectively criticised on cost grounds. However, Auber is often mentioned as a good example of a planning policy attached to grand public spaces that was particularly current in the 1960s and in France.

Auber forms part of a complex of connected underground stations. The scale of Auber, in particular, makes the ensemble one of the largest underground stations in the world in terms of volume.

Particulate pollution

During busy periods, PM10 particle pollution caused by train braking regularly reaches 400 μg/m3 at Auber, eight times the EU Commission's daily average limit.

Gallery

Connected stations
Auber is connected to the following stations:
 Havre–Caumartin
 Paris Métro Line 3
 Paris Métro Line 9
 Opéra
 Paris Métro Line 3
 Paris Métro Line 7
 Paris Métro Line 8
 Haussmann–Saint-Lazare
 RER E
 Saint-Lazare
 Paris Métro Line 3
 Paris Métro Line 12
 Paris Métro Line 13
 Paris Métro Line 14
 Saint-Augustin
 Paris Métro Line 9

See also

List of stations of the Paris RER
List of stations of the Paris Métro

References

A
A
G